Tigerstripe Ridge is the north ridge of Flagship Mountain, notable for the alternating stripes of rock and snow which extend over much of its length, in the Convoy Range, Victoria Land. Descriptively named from the tigerlike stripes by a 1989-90 New Zealand Antarctic Research Program (NZARP) field party.

Ridges of Victoria Land
Scott Coast